The Sébé (or Sebe) River is a river which flows in Gabon.

It is a tributary of the Ogooue River, and passes through Okondja, Haut-Ogooué. Its own tributaries are the Loula River and the Lebiri River.

References 

 National Geographic.2003. African Adventure Atlas Pg 24,72. led by Sean Fraser
 Lerique Jacques.1983. Hydrographie-Hydrologie. in Geographie et Cartographie du Gabon, Atlas Illustré led by The Ministère de l'Education Nationale de la Republique Gabonaise. Pg 14–15. Paris, France: Edicef

Rivers of Gabon